The 26th César Awards ceremony, presented by the Académie des Arts et Techniques du Cinéma, honoured the best films of 2000 in France and took place on 24 February 2001 at the Théâtre des Champs-Élysées in Paris. The ceremony was chaired by Daniel Auteuil and hosted by Édouard Baer. The Taste of Others won the award for Best Film.

Winners and nominees

See also
 73rd Academy Awards
 54th British Academy Film Awards
 13th European Film Awards
 6th Lumières Awards

External links

 Official website
 
 26th César Awards at AlloCiné

2001
2001 film awards
2001 in French cinema
February 2001 events in France